Douglas W. Oldenburg is a pastor and President Emeritus at Columbia Theological Seminary. He served as the moderator of the 210th General Assembly of the Presbyterian Church (USA) in 1998.

Education 
Douglas Oldenburg was born in Muskegon, Michigan and grew up in Charlotte, North Carolina. He attended college at Davidson College, where he earned a B.S. in 1956. In 1960, he continued to Union Theological Seminary in Virginia where he received a B.D. in 1960. After this he studied at Yale Divinity School where he earned his S.T.M. in 1961. He has also gone on to be awarded four honorary Doctorate of Divinity degrees (Rhodes College, Budapest Reformed Theological Academy, St. Andrews Presbyterian College, and Davis and Elkins College) and two honorary Doctor of Humane Letters (Hastings College and Davidson College).

Career 
Following his graduation from Union Theological Seminary in Virginia he served as pastor at Covenant Presbyterian Church in Lynchburg, Virginia. After seven years he served as a pastor at Davis Memorial Church in Elkins, West Virginia. He last served as pastor in the city where he grew up, Charlotte, North Carolina. After serving a total of twenty-six years as pastor, he then became the seventh president of Columbia Theological Seminary in 1987, which he held until 2000.

He served many institutions and churches including the Presbyterian Church (USA). He served on a variety of committees for the General Assembly of the Presbyterian Church (USA) and became the moderator of the 210th General Assembly in 1998. His platform largely centered on theological education and social justice. He called for support of the ordination of educators and for unity among the nation's church related colleges and universities. As Moderator, he called for every congregation and presbytery to engage in a program of study about what Presbyterians believe about the Bible and how they read the Bible.

In the various communities he served on local committees. In Lynchburg, Virginia he helped to organize a downtown ministry for disadvantaged children. In Elkins, West Virginia he led a successful vote on a bond levy to raise teacher salaries. In Charlotte, North Carolina he was on the Board of United Community Services and was a co-founder and board member of Crisis Assistance Ministry. He received the Martin Luther King, Jr. award and The Order of the Hornet of Mecklenburg County. In Atlanta, Georgia he served on the board of Global Health Action and the University Center of Georgia. For many years, he served on the board of Focused Community Strategies (FCS Urban Ministries) and the Protestant Radio and Television Center (now called Day1).

In 2018, Doug Oldenburg was recognized as a distinguished leader in theological education by the Committee on Theological Education and the Theological Education Fund at the General Assembly for the Presbyterian Church (U.S.A.) for his commitment and contribution to theological education and the Presbyterian Church.

Publications 
He has contributed several articles to different publications. These include:
The Anguish of the Earth, Journal for Preachers, 1991.
Reflections of a Pastor/President, Theological Education Leadership, Volume XXXII, Supplement III, 1996.
 The Growing Economic Disparities in the United States, Journal for Preachers, 1997.

References 

People from Muskegon, Michigan
Union Presbyterian Seminary alumni
Columbia Theological Seminary people
Presbyterian Church (USA) teaching elders
Yale Divinity School alumni
Davidson College alumni
Living people
Year of birth missing (living people)